The Övdög Khudag Coal Mine (knee well, sometimes Ovdog Hudag) is a coal mine being developed in the Bayanjargalan sum of the Dundgovi in southern central Mongolia. The deposit has coal reserves amounting to projected 89 million tonnes of Lignite. Together with the "Ikh ulaan uul" (big red lake) deposit nearby it comprises the "Black Hills" development.

References 

Coal mines in Mongolia